Metodiev is a Bulgarian surname. Notable people with the surname include:

Angel Metodiev (1921-1984), Bulgarian painter
Vladislav Metodiev (born 1980), Bulgarian wrestler
Vasil Metodiev (1935-2019), Bulgarian footballer

References